Rooney Mara is an American actress. Mara's first credited television role was a guest appearance in the NBC crime drama series Law & Order: Special Victims Unit in 2006. Along with the other The Social Network (2010) cast members, she received a nomination for the Critics' Choice Movie Award for Best Acting Ensemble. After playing minor roles in several films and television shows, she starred in her first major role as Lisbeth Salander in the 2011 film adaptation of Stieg Larsson's The Girl with the Dragon Tattoo—the role brought her international recognition. She received several nominations for her performance, including the Academy Award for Best Actress, the Golden Globe Award for Best Actress in a Motion Picture – Drama, the Empire Award for Best Actress, and the Saturn Award for Best Actress, and won a Breakthrough Performance Award from the National Board of Review.

Mara starred in Todd Haynes's romantic drama Carol (2015), based on the 1952 romance novel The Price of Salt by Patricia Highsmith (republished as Carol in 1990). Her performance in the film garnered widespread critical acclaim and earned her nominations for the Academy Award for Best Supporting Actress, the BAFTA Award for Best Actress in a Supporting Role, and the Golden Globe Award for Best Actress in a Motion Picture – Drama, and won her the Cannes Film Festival Award for Best Actress. In Pan (2015), her portraying of the character Tiger Lily received mixed critical reviews, and garnered her a Golden Raspberry Award for Worst Supporting Actress nomination. Mara's performance as Mary Magdalene, who traveled with Jesus as one of his followers, in the biographical drama Mary Magdalene (2018), garnered her nominations for the AACTA Award for Best Actress in a Leading Role and the Asia Pacific Screen Award for Best Performance by an Actress.

Awards and nominations

Notes

References

External links 
 

Mara, Rooney